In video games, a clan, community, guild or faction is an organized group of video game players that regularly play together in one or more multiplayer games. Many clans take part in gaming competitions, but some clans are just small gaming squads consisting of friends. These squads  range from groups of a few friends to four-thousand plus person organizations, with a broad range of structures, goals and members. The lifespan of a clan also varies considerably, from a few weeks to over a decade. Numerous clans exist for nearly every online game available today, notably in first-person shooters (FPS), massively multiplayer games (MMO), role-playing video games (RPG), and strategy games. There are also meta-groups that span a wide variety of games. Some clans formed by groups of players have grown into multi-million dollar professional esports teams.

Many clans on Xbox One, PlayStation 4, and computers have official clan websites with forums to interact and discuss many topics with the rest of their clan. They offer in-clan awards and medals for clan achievements ranging from time in the clan to wins and contributions to the group like donations and prizes for giveaways. The terms alliance and team are also used for this purpose in, e.g., Illyriad or Freeciv.

In first-person shooters
As the first-person shooter (FPS) genre became increasingly popular, the idea of a competitive clan became widely accepted. Clans became teams, or elite clan members form teams to represent the clan in online battle. FPS clans normally host servers with rules that they like. For instance if a group of gamers like to use pistols only they could join a clan that runs a pistols only server and the clan would enforce the rules.

In role-playing games
Clans also exist in other genres, where they are often referred to by a different name and serve a purpose more suited to the game. Many massively multiplayer online (MMO) and role-playing video games (RPGs) tend to call them "guilds" or invent their own term. Examples of this include Star Wars Galaxies ("player associations") and EVE Online ("corporations"). EVE Online is also notable for having defined the system in more detail than is common in most MMOs, with "alliances" being a larger grouping. The final form of community in Eve is known as a Coalition which are grouping of multiple alliances, this system isn't supported by the game software instead are a player driven creation.  
In the superhero-based game City of Heroes, they are called "supergroups", and are similar in structure to comic book hero organizations like the X-Men. In Final Fantasy XI, such clans are called "linkshells" and players of the game have the tendency and ability to be in more than one at once. Final Fantasy XIV also shares the same system for Linkshells as Final Fantasy XI but also with the addition of "Free Companies" which allow for the more traditional form of Clan and Guild system seen in most MMORPG games.

In simulation games
Many simulation games, such as those in the Microsoft Flight Simulator series, have clans that follow similar patterns to other genres.  Notable types of simulation clans include virtual airlines (VAs) and Virtual Military Organizations (VMOs). A virtual airline is a dedicated hobby organization that uses flight simulation to model the operations of an airline. VAs generally have a presence on the Internet, similar to a real airline. It has been proposed that there are over 100 VAs of significance currently active, with tens of thousands of participants at any one time.

References

Further reading
Harvesting the Hive:How online games drive innovation article from Esther Dyson's EDventure, see section "Beyond collaboration:Group to group interaction".
Computer Games and the Mi Games" by J.C. Herz.
Youth in Transition:The Challenge of Generational change in Asia proceedings of the 15th Biennial Association of Asian Social Science Research Councils released by UNESCO Bangkok, see section 16 "Youth culture in online game worlds: Emergence of cyber lifestyles in Korean society" by Sang-Min Whang, Department of Psychology Yonsei University.

Video game organizations